Henriettea membranifolia, the thinleaf camasey, is a species of plant in the family Melastomataceae. It is endemic to Puerto Rico.

References

membranifolia
Endemic flora of Puerto Rico
Critically endangered plants
Taxonomy articles created by Polbot
Taxa named by Alfred Cogniaux